Major Padmapani Acharya, MVC (21 June 1969 – 28 June 1999) was an officer in the Indian Army. He was awarded the second highest Indian military honour, Maha Vir Chakra posthumously for his actions during the Kargil War on 28 June 1999.

Personal life
Acharya was originally from Odisha and was a resident of Hyderabad, Telangana. Acharya was married to Charulatha. Acharya's father, Jagannath Acharya, was a retired Wing Commander of the Indian Air Force, during 1965 and 1971 wars with Pakistan. He then worked with the Defence Research and Development Laboratory (DRDL) in Hyderabad. Maj. Acharya was survived by his parents, wife and his daughter, Aparajita, who was born a few months after his death. Aparajita Acharya has been an NCC cadet.

Military career
Acharya graduated from the Officers Training Academy, Madras in 1993 and was commissioned as a Second Lieutenant into the 2nd battalion, The Rajputana Rifles (2 Raj Rif).

Kargil War 
At the outbreak of the Kargil War, Acharya was in command of a Company of 2 Raj Rif. Acharya wrote to his father:

Maha Vir Chakra 
The citation for the Maha Vir Chakra reads as follows:

In popular culture
The events of Battle of Tololing was adapted as one of the prominent battle scenes in the Hindi war film LOC Kargil in which actor Nagarjuna Akkineni portrayed the role of Acharya.

See also
 Digendra Kumar
 Neikezhakuo Kenguruse
 Magod Basappa Ravindranath

References

Indian Army officers
Recipients of the Maha Vir Chakra
People of the Kargil War
People from Odisha
1999 deaths
1969 births